Galina Mikhailovna Gebruk (20 May 1933 – 24 May  2022) was a prisoner of the , a survivor and witness of the Holocaust, an activist of the Jewish movement in Russia and Veteran of Labour.

Born in 1933 to Russian father Mikhail Kryuchkov and Jewish mother Disya Zalmanovna.

Her husband was artist Ivan Gebruk (born 1932), an Estonian Jew. They met in Siberia. Their children are Andrei and Ekaterina.

References

Literature
 Maya Dobychina. The Jewish Ghetto in Kaluga, November-December 1941    (2012)
 Maria Gilyova / Tatyana Pasman.  We Cannot be Silent. Schoolchildren and Students about the Holocaust (2017)
 Vadim Dubson. Ghetto in the Occupied Territory of the Russian Federation (1941-1942) // Bulletin of the Jewish University. —  2000. —  No. 3 (21). —  p. 157-184.
 Ilya Altman. The Holocaust on the territory of the USSR: Encyclopedia  (2009)  —  p. 378-379.  
 Sergei Mikheyenkov. Stop Guderian. 50th Army in the Battles for Tula and Kaluga. 1941-1942 (2013)
 Boris Saltsman. Catastrophe: To Know and Remember. 
 Leonid Yuzefovich, Zakhar Prilepin, Galina Yuzefovich, Marina Stepnova and others. How We Survived the War. Folk Stories 
 Gai Miron. The Yad Vashem Encyclopedia of the Ghettos during the Holocoust (2009) — p. 1067

External links 
 Поимённые списки узников еврейского гетто в г. Калуге

1933 births
2022 deaths
People from Kaluga
Nazi-era ghetto inmates
Holocaust survivors
Soviet Jews
Russian Jews
Russian people of  Jewish descent
Soviet women in World War II
Jewish concentration camp survivors
Russian anti-war activists
Holocaust commemoration
20th-century Russian Jews
21st-century Russian Jews